"Marilyn Monroe" is a song written, produced, and performed by American musician Pharrell Williams. It features additional spoken vocals from British TV personality Kelly Osbourne. The song was released on March 10, 2014 as the second single from Williams' second studio album Girl (2014). The song's intro was written by American violinist Ann Marie Calhoun, and it takes its name from the deceased 
Hollywood actress of the same name.

Composition

The opening track on Williams' second studio album, Girl (2014), "Marilyn Monroe" begins with an orchestral string introduction. The song's production is characterized by Williams' signature "skittering" beat and "bumping" bass line, and its lyrics discuss "helpless romantics and the perfect lady." Its chorus contains references to several female historical figures, including actress Marilyn Monroe, Egyptian queen Cleopatra, and French heroine Joan of Arc. In the song's lyrics, Williams dismisses all three as "[meaning] nothing to [him]" and laments that he "just [wants] a different girl." Kelly Osbourne provides spoken backing vocals on the song.

Release
In an interview with New York radio station Power 105.1, Williams revealed that "Marilyn Monroe" would be released as the second single from G I R L. On March 10, 2014, the single was added to the playlist of British urban contemporary radio station BBC Radio 1Xtra along with the Williams song "Brand New". Prior to its single release, the song had debuted at number 52 on the Dutch Single Top 100 chart. Professional dancer Khadija Nicholas was hired by Pharrell to pose for the single's cover.

Track listing
 CD single (Germany)
 "Marilyn Monroe"
 "Marilyn Monroe" (instrumental)

Music video
The music video for the song, directed by Luis Cerveró, was released on April 23, 2014.

Credits and personnel
 Pharrell Williams – lead vocals, songwriting, keyboards, synthesizers, guitar, bass guitar, programming, percussion, production, executive production
 Ann Marie Calhoun – songwriting
 Kelly Osbourne – background vocals

Charts

Weekly charts

Year-end charts

Certifications

Release history

References

External links
 

2014 singles
2014 songs
Pharrell Williams songs
Song recordings produced by Pharrell Williams
Songs written by Pharrell Williams
Columbia Records singles
Songs about Marilyn Monroe
American funk songs